Musa Mudde (born 23 May 1990) is an Ugandan professional footballer who plays as a midfielder.

Career
Musa Mudde made his professional debut in India, playing for Gokulam Kerala in the I-League.

Career statistics

Club
Statistics accurate as of 22 January 2018

Honours
Gokulam Kerala
 Kerala Premier League: 2017–18

References

External links
 

Living people
1990 births
Ugandan footballers
Uganda international footballers
Association football midfielders
Sofapaka F.C. players
Simba S.C. players
A.F.C. Leopards players
Bandari F.C. (Kenya) players
Gokulam Kerala FC players
Kenyan Premier League players
I-League players
Ugandan expatriate footballers
Ugandan expatriate sportspeople in Kenya
Ugandan expatriate sportspeople in Tanzania
Ugandan expatriate sportspeople in India
Expatriate footballers in Kenya
Expatriate footballers in Tanzania
Expatriate footballers in India
People from Kampala
Calcutta Football League players
Tanzanian Premier League players